In enzymology, a dibenzothiophene dihydrodiol dehydrogenase is an enzyme that catalyzes the chemical reaction

cis-1,2-dihydroxy-1,2-dihydrodibenzothiophene + NAD+  1,2-dihydroxydibenzothiophene + NADH + H+

Thus, the two substrates of this enzyme are cis-1,2-dihydroxy-1,2-dihydrodibenzothiophene and NAD+, whereas its 3 products are 1,2-dihydroxydibenzothiophene, NADH, and H+.

This enzyme belongs to the family of oxidoreductases, specifically those acting on the CH-CH group of donor with NAD+ or NADP+ as acceptor.  The systematic name of this enzyme class is cis-1,2-dihydroxy-1,2-dihydrodibenzothiophene:NAD+ oxidoreductase.

References

 
 

EC 1.3.1
NADH-dependent enzymes
Enzymes of unknown structure